Maurice Carey Blake (October 20, 1815 – September 26, 1897) was the 19th Mayor of San Francisco, serving from December 5, 1881, to January 7, 1883.

Blake was born on October 20, 1815, in Otisville, Maine. After graduating from Bowdoin College, he came to San Francisco in 1853. He became a lawyer in California and practiced law there. In 1857, he first became a county judge (which he served until 1862) and then a probate judge. At the same time, in 1857, he served as a member of the California State Assembly until 1858. In 1881, he became the Mayor of San Francisco and served for only two years. Just one year after leaving office, he became a delegate to the Republican National Convention in 1884. Blake died of a heart attack in San Francisco on September 26, 1897. He is interred at Mount Tamalpais Cemetery in San Rafael, California.

His nephew's daughter, Anna Blake Mezquida, became a writer and journalist in San Francisco.

References

1815 births
1897 deaths
Mayors of San Francisco
California Republicans
19th-century American politicians